Bibb City  is a former company town of the Bibb Manufacturing Company in Muscogee County, Georgia, United States. At the 2000 census, it had a total population of 510.  The entire city area, consisting of historic Columbus Mill area and the associated mill village owned by the Bibb Manufacturing Company, is listed on the National Register of Historic Places as Bibb City Historic District.

Bibb City was incorporated in 1909 as a city surrounding—and managed by—the Bibb Manufacturing Company, which operated a textile mill there. After the mill closed in 1998, the city dissolved its charter on December 7, 2000, lacking funding to continue city operations.  Bibb City was annexed by the city of Columbus, of which it is now a neighborhood. In September 2006, Bibb City was nominated as an historic district for the National Register of Historic Places by Georgia's State Historic Preservation Officer. On February 14, 2010, the national designation was approved for The Bibb City Historic District and it was listed in the NRHP.

Geography
Bibb City is located at  (32.501441, -84.991956).

According to the United States Census Bureau, the town has a total area of 0.2 square miles (0.4 km2), all land.

Demographics

At the census of 2000, there were 510 people, 220 households, and 117 families residing in the town. The racial makeup of the town was 92.16% White, 4.31% African American, 0.98% Native American, 0.20% Asian, 0.20% Pacific Islander, 0.20% from other races, and 1.96% from two or more races. Hispanic or Latino of any race were 0.78% of the population.

There were 220 households, out of which 24.5% had children under the age of 18 living with them, 32.3% were married couples living together, 15.9% had a female householder with no husband present, and 46.4% were non-families. 39.5% of all households were made up of individuals, and 19.5% had someone living alone who was 65 years of age or older. The average household size was 2.32 and the average family size was 3.18.

In the town the population was spread out, with 24.1% under the age of 18, 12.0% from 18 to 24, 25.9% from 25 to 44, 21.4% from 45 to 64, and 16.7% who were 65 years of age or older. The median age was 36 years. For every 100 females, there were 90.3 males. For every 100 females age 18 and over, there were 90.6 males.

The median income for a household in the town was $24,107, and the median income for a family was $23,125. Males had a median income of $27,083 versus $21,071 for females. The per capita income for the town was $13,068. About 27.9% of families and 32.6% of the population were below the poverty line, including 57.1% of those under age 18 and 19.4% of those age 65 or over.

Bibb Manufacturing's Columbus Mill

The centerpiece of Bibb City was Bibb Manufacturing Company's  Columbus Mill. At its peak in the 1940s, the mill employed 2,500 workers and was the largest cotton mill in the United States. In that segregated era, most of the textile workers were white.

The mill closed in 1998 but was left standing. Shortly after midnight on October 30, 2008, the  Columbus Mill was destroyed by a massive fire. After a four-day joint investigation by the ATF and the Columbus Department of Fire and Emergency Medical Services, the cause of the blaze remained undetermined.

Climate
The climate in this area is characterized by relatively high temperatures and evenly distributed precipitation throughout the year.  According to the Köppen Climate Classification system, Bibb City has a humid subtropical climate, abbreviated "Cfa" on climate maps.

References

Unincorporated communities in Georgia (U.S. state)
Former municipalities in Georgia (U.S. state)
Unincorporated communities in Muscogee County, Georgia
Georgia populated places on the Chattahoochee River
Populated places disestablished in 2000